The Doucet River is a tributary of the southern shore of Lac au Lard, in the hydrographic slope of the Jeannotte River, in the territory of the town of La Tuque, in the administrative region of Mauricie, in Quebec, in Canada. This river flows in the zec de la Bessonne.

The course of the Doucet River descends on the west side of the Batiscan River and on the east side of the Saint-Maurice River. This river is part of the hydrographic side of the Batiscan river which generally winds south to the north shore of the St. Lawrence River.

This hydrographic slope is mainly served by the path of Lac au Lard which passes on the east side of this valley.

Since the mid-19th century, forestry has been the predominant activity of the Doucet River watershed; recreational activities, second.

The surface of the Doucet River (except the rapids areas) is generally frozen from the beginning of December to the end of March. However, safe circulation on the ice is generally done from the end of December to the beginning of March. The water level of the river varies with the seasons and the precipitation.

Geography 
The Doucet river draws its source from Lake Perdrix located in La Tuque.

The Doucet River flows into the town of La Tuque, at the bottom of a bay on the south shore of lac au Lard. This confluence of the Doucet river is located at:
  West of the confluence of the Jeannotte River and the Batiscan River;
  south of the confluence of the ruisseau du Lac au Lard and the Jeannotte river;
  south-east of Petit lac Wayagamac;
  South of the village center of Lac-Édouard;
  Southeast of downtown La Tuque.

From the mouth, the current crosses north on  lac au Lard, descends successively to the northeast on  the course of the Lac au Lard stream, to the south then eastward on  the course of the Jeannotte River, and on  the course of the Batiscan River which flows onto the northwest bank of the St. Lawrence River.

Toponymy 
The term Doucet turns out to be a family name of French origin. The toponym "Rivière Doucet" was formalized on April 3, 1986, at the Commission de toponymie du Québec.

See also 

 Zec de la Bessonne, a controlled harvesting zone (zec)
 La Tuque, a city
 Ruisseau du Lac au Lard
 Lac au Lard
 Jeannotte River, a stream
 Batiscan River, a stream
 St. Lawrence River, a stream
 List of rivers of Quebec

References 

La Tuque, Quebec
Rivers of Mauricie